West Virginia Illusion was an American women’s soccer team, founded in 2008, which is a member of the United Soccer Leagues W-League. The Illusion played in the Atlantic Division of the Eastern Conference. The team folded after the 2008 season.

The team played their home games in the stadium on the campus of Fairmont State University in Fairmont, West Virginia. The club's colors was black and white.

Squad 2015

Season-by-season record

External links
West Virginia Illusion

Defunct USL W-League (1995–2015) teams
Women's soccer clubs in the United States
Soccer clubs in West Virginia
2008 establishments in West Virginia
2008 disestablishments in West Virginia
Defunct sports teams in West Virginia
Association football clubs established in 2008
Association football clubs disestablished in 2008
Women's sports in West Virginia